Azzedine Sakhri (born 22 January 1968 in Algiers) is a retired Algerian long-distance runner who specialized in the marathon race.

He won the gold medal at the 1997 Mediterranean Games, finished eighth at the 1997 World Championships and fifth at the 2001 Mediterranean Games.

He also competed at the 1999 World Championships as well as the World Cross Country Championships in 1997, 1998, 1999 and 2002 without further success.

Achievements

Personal bests
5000 metres - 13:39.83 min (1993)
10,000 metres - 28:28.11 min (1994)
Half marathon - 1:02:51 hrs
Marathon - 2:13:57 hrs (1996)

References

External links

marathoninfo

1968 births
Living people
Algerian male long-distance runners
Algerian male marathon runners
People from Algiers
Mediterranean Games gold medalists for Algeria
Mediterranean Games medalists in athletics
Athletes (track and field) at the 1997 Mediterranean Games
Athletes (track and field) at the 2001 Mediterranean Games
21st-century Algerian people